TransMolecular is a biotech company located in Birmingham, Alabama. It is geared to finding anti-cancer targeted drugs.

As of March 2011, TransMolecular, Inc. was acquired by Morphotek, Inc. TransMolecular, Inc. engages in discovering, developing, and commercializing therapies for glioma, metastatic brain tumors, and cancers. It offers TM601, a synthetic a polypeptide based on amino acid peptide derived from scorpion venom, which is used to treat cancer. The company was founded in 1996.

Controversy 
Transmolecular has received protests in the past because of their contract with Huntingdon Life Sciences (HLS) who has been the target of an international campaign by Stop Huntingdon Animal Cruelty because of their animal cruelty. Transmolecular contracted out to them at least once and has refused to cut their ties with them.

References

External links
 Official site

Biotechnology companies of the United States
Companies based in Birmingham, Alabama